Asma Abulyazeid is an Egyptian actress and singer.

She drew attention through her performance of the character "Toka" in the TV series "This Evening" in 2017, and participated in many series and films, also participated in the band "Bahgaga" and presented several monologues in several concerts. She is known for her leading role as Farah in MBC4 satricial romantic dramedy  series Miss Farah (2019-2022), Arabic adaptation of the The CW American satirical romantic dramedy series Jane the Virgin (2014–2019).

Early life 
She was born in Cairo, Egypt.Her father was from Cairo and she was mother from Sharqia.Asmaa liked acting from a very young age, but she could not do acting in her school because of no school theater, but she finally got a chance to perform at college from the first year,in the Atelier Theater.

In the "Theater Atelier" she trained under the hands of director Shadi Daly, and participated in a large number of solo performances, the latest of which was the "Magic Mix of Happiness", which competed in the Arab Theater Festival for the "Sheikh Sultan Al Qasimi Award" for the best Arab theatrical show for 2016.

Her first theatrical performance was a presentation of the team in her first semester at the college, under the title "Life is Beautiful in Fine Arts", and in the second semester of the same year, she participated in "Antar Stable", directed by the artist Bayoumi Fouad, to "Atelier" The stage".

In 2014, she participated in the series "I Loved"  by Maryam Al Ahmadi, but it was a small role consisting of several scenes.

She was nominated by producer Ahmed Medhat Sadeq, directed by Tamer Mohsen, to perform the role of "Toka" this evening, and after passing all the tests, which led to the role she got it.

She began filming the role with a sense of fear to stand for the first time in front of the cameras in a role of this size, especially for the confidence placed in the director, who always told her not to feel the role in order to excel.she loved the role of Taqa because of the qualities of kindness, hospitality and sensitivity.but they were different and much stronger than they really are.

Abulyazeid went through the experience as a director by directing the play "Melodrama", in 2013, as "Habhan", as well as assisting the director Shadi Daly in the play "Dream Plastic" in which she then played a role, and "Made in China", and The Revolution of the Dead.

Filmography

Feature films 

One Moment, Please (2011)
Talk About The Eyebrow (2018)
Al Kowayseen (2018)
The Bullet (2018)
122 (2019)
The Passage (2019)

Television 
 The choice 2 (2021)
 Zodiac (2019)
 Hogan (2019)
 Eugenie Nights (2018)
 This evening (2017)
 I'm Shahira ... I'm the traitor (2017)
 I'm in love (2014)
 Teen Wolf (2015)
 Miss Farah (2019–2022)

Plays 

Melodrama (2013)
 Made In China
 Revolution Of The Dead

Awards
 Best Actress at Elia Short Film Festival 2019.

References

External links

Egyptian film actresses
Egyptian television actresses
Egyptian stage actresses
Musicians from Cairo
21st-century Egyptian women singers
Year of birth missing (living people)
Living people